George (died 29 April 2007) was a pet dog in Taranaki, New Zealand, that was credited with sacrificing his life to save local children from a dog attack. George's heroism was internationally recognized, and he received posthumous awards from New Zealand and British animal charities.

Biography
A -tall Jack Russell Terrier with "a heart condition", George lived in Manaia, Taranaki, New Zealand with his owner, widower Alan Gay (born ). George previously lived with Gay's neighbours, but they offered the dog to Gay when they moved away because "the dog spent so much time at his place."

Defensive action
The Sydney Morning Herald and The New Zealand Herald reported that on 29 April 2007, five children in Manaia were walking home when they were attacked by two pit bulls. Nine-year-old (born ) George defended the children, but was severely injured by the melee. Gay's veterinarian recommended euthanising George, and while Gay reluctantly agreed with the course of action, he later came to regret the decision. The pit bulls were also euthanised, and their owner  prosecution for owning dangerous and uncontrolled dogs." Six months later, the Stratford Press reported that it had been one pit bull versus a 14-year-old (born ) George protecting three children. In February 2009, Sky News reported that George had been 14 years old when he faced off two pit bulls to defend five children aged 3–12.

In the aftermath, George was praised and memorialised for his bravery and sacrifice. The Royal New Zealand Society for the Prevention of Cruelty to Animals awarded him a medal for bravery, the first awarded to a dog in 17 years, and the first non-police dog to ever receive it; Gay was to receive George's medal at the children's school. Jerrell Hudman, a United States Marine Corps veteran of the Vietnam War, was so impressed by George's actions, he told the Taranaki Herald that he would send Gay one of his three Purple Hearts. In spring 2007, a bronze statue of George was unveiled in Manaia, the work of New Plymouth's Fridtjof Hanson. In 2009, the People's Dispensary for Sick Animals awarded George the PDSA Gold Medal, a decoration Sky News described as "the animal equivalent of the George Cross"; the medal was hung about the neck of George's statue by Anand Satyanand, then-Governor-General of New Zealand.

See also
 List of individual dogs

References

External links
 

2007 animal deaths
deaths due to dog attacks
individual animals in New Zealand
individual dogs